Francesco Mancini (24 April 1679–August 1758) was an Italian painter whose works are known between 1719 and 1756. He was the pupil of Carlo Cignani.

Biography
A native of Sant'Angelo in Vado, he was a student of Carlo Cignani at Forlì and at Bologna and was introduced to academic painting in the manner of the Carracci; echoes of this style of painting can be seen in his juvenile works: the frescoes  of the Libreria in the main hall of the Biblioteca Classense in Ravenna, and those in Foligno Cathedral depicting the Life of Angela di Foligno.

On the advice of the artist Marcantonio Franceschini, vice-prince of the Accademia Clementina in Bologna, he moved to Rome, where he made contact with Carlo Maratta, also a native of the Marche. This contact with Maratta's mature work, and with his pupils, is reflected by further developments in Mancini's painting. From this period are the frescoes in the Palazzo del Quirinale, those in the Chiesa Nuova dei Filippini in Perugia (1730), in the Marian Shrine of the Basilica of Santa Maria della Misericordia, Macerata (1736), and others at Sant'Angelo in Vado, Forlì and Rimini. Francesco Mancini was held by his contemporaries as one of the best painters of the time: above all, the clear and luminous tones of his work were admired. He was a member of the French Academy in Rome (1732), the Accademia dei Virtuosi in the Pantheon of Rome (1743 and 1745) and director of the Accademia di San Luca (1750–51).

His pupils included Sebastiano Ceccarini, Domenico Corvi, Niccolò Lapiccola of Crotone and Canon Giovanni Andrea Lazzarini.

Selected works
 Nascita della vergine, Napoli, Collezione Molaro
 Addolorata, Pinacoteca di Fano
 Dominique quo vadis?, Pinacoteca Comunale di Città di Castello
 Apparizione di Gesù Cristo a San Pietro, Roma, Palazzo Quirinale
 Cristo in Gloria con i Santi Clemente e Ignazio d'Antiochia, Urbino, Galleria Nazionale delle Marche 
 Estasi di Santa Teresa, Roma, Chiesa di Santa Maria della Scala
 La Castità che fustiga Amore, Roma, Palazzo del Quirinale
 La Concezione, Roma, Chiesa di San Gregorio al Celio
 Lotta fra Amore e Pan, Roma, Pinacoteca Vaticana, Sala XV, inventario 40748
 Riposo durante la fuga in Egitto, Roma, Pinacoteca Vaticana, Sala XV, inventario 40398
 Sacra Famiglia, Roma, Palazzo Quirinale
 San Damiano, Roma, Chiesa di San Gregorio al Celio
 San Francesco in preghiera, Pinacoteca di Fano 
 San Francesco di Paola, Sant'Angelo in Vado, Church of Santa Maria dei Servi
 San Giovanni Battista, Pinacoteca di Fano 
 San Nicola da Tolentino, Sant'Angelo in Vado, Church of Santa Maria dei Servi
 San Pietro e San Giovanni che guariscono uno storpio, Roma, Palazzo del Quirinale
 Sant'Agnese, Pinacoteca di Ancona
 Storie di Amore e Psiche, Roma, Palazzo Colonna
 Transito di San Giuseppe, Pinacoteca di Fano 
 Via Crucis, Pioraco, Chiesa di San Francesco
 Vergine Addolorata, Urbino, Galleria Nazionale delle Marche 
Assunzione della Vergine, Convento Reale di Mafra - Portogallo

Bibliography
 Accademia nazionale di San Luca, Memorie per servire alla storia della Romana Accademia di S. Luca fino alla morte di Antonio Canova, compilate da Melchior Missirini. Roma: Stamperia De Romanis, 1823, p. 227-8 (on-line)
 Amico Ricci, Memorie storiche delle arti e degli artisti della Marca di Ancona, del marchese Amico Ricci. Macerata: Tipografia di Alessandro Mancini, 1834, vol. I, pp. 415–117 (on-line)
 "MANCINI (Francesco)" in Carlo Antonio Vanzon (ed.), Dizionario universale della lingua italiana ed insieme di geografia, ecc,  preceduto da una esposizione grammaticale ragionata della lingua italiana, Livorno: dalla Stamperia di Paolo Vannini, 1836, Tomo IV (M-N-O), p. 91 (on-line)
 Hermann Voss, Die Malerei des Barock in Rom. Berlin: im Propylaen Verlag, 1924.

Notes

External links

 Answers.com: Francesco Mancini
 Francesco Mancini, Cristo in Gloria con i Santi Clemente e Ignazio d’Antiochia, 1732/33, Urbino, Galleria Nazionale delle Marche
 Francesco Mancini, Vergine Addolorata

17th-century Italian painters
Italian male painters
18th-century Italian painters
Italian Baroque painters
1679 births
1758 deaths
18th-century Italian male artists